The 2012 Open 88 Contrexéville was a professional tennis tournament played on outdoor clay courts. It was the 6th edition of the tournament and was part of the 2012 ITF Women's Circuit. It took place in Contrexéville, France between 16 and 22 July 2012.

WTA entrants

Seeds

 Rankings are as of July 9, 2012.

Other entrants
The following players received wildcards into the singles main draw:
  Céline Cattaneo
  Elixane Lechemia
  Anaève Pain

The following players received entry from the qualifying draw:
  Virginie Ayassamy
  Ema Mikulčić
  Daria Salnikova
  Charlène Seateun

Champions

Singles

 Aravane Rezaï def.  Yvonne Meusburger, 6–3, 2–6, 6–3

Doubles

 Yuliya Beygelzimer /  Renata Voráčová def.  Tereza Mrdeža /  Silvia Njirić, 6–1, 6–1

External links
Official website
ITF website

Open 88 Contrexeville
2012 in French tennis
Grand Est Open 88